"Working Man" is a song written by Jim Hurt and Billy Ray Reynolds, and recorded by American country music artist John Conlee.  It was released in March 1985 as the second single from album Blue Highway.  The song reached #7 on the Billboard Hot Country Singles & Tracks chart.

Chart performance

References

1985 singles
1984 songs
John Conlee songs
MCA Records singles
Songs written by Jim Hurt